Los Nietos, Spain is a small fishing village with its own individual marina  on the Mar Menor, which began as a very small fishing settlement and was later urbanised to allow more holiday homes by the Mar Menor.  It is now a busy community with many visitors, especially in the summer, with some events at other times. Many foreigners, mainly British, live there.  The village is at the eastern terminus of the Cartagena-Los Nietos commuter railway line.

The Mar Menor has a 73 km coastline perimeter with numerous beaches with clear, shallow water (maximum depth 7m). The Mar Menor lagoon covers an area of 170km2 – making it the largest Saltwater lake in Europe. 
The average annual temperature is 17 °C, winters are mild, with average temperatures not falling much below 10 °C.

La Manga del Mar Menor itself is a narrow strip of land between two seas, the Mediterranean and Mar Menor, measuring up to 300m in breadth & 21 km in length. It has over 40 km of sandy beaches, a casino, hotels, and is close to the airport, Murcia central, and to one of the oldest cities in Spain, Cartagena.

Los Alcazares is an old fishing village of 20 km2 with 7 km of beaches from Los Narejos to Punta Brava. There is good transport to Los Alcazares and other nearby places.

Santiago de la Ribera appeared in 1888 around a hermitage named after the apostle Santiago, and founded by Friar Jose Maria Barnuevo Rodrigo de Villamayor, who was a knight of the Military Order of Santiago – for this reason the town was named Santiago de la Ribera.

Cabo de Palos is a bay on the Mediterranean side of La Manga just before the strip itself. The village has been built on a volcanic backbone of the Murcian coast where fishing has remained one of the livelihoods of the area although it has been modernized.

Playa Honda, Mar de Cristal, Islas Menores, Los Nietos, Los Urrutias and Punta Brava are small hamlets and villages following the coastline.

References

Fishing communities in Spain
Populated places in the Region of Murcia